is a Japanese word meaning "bond". It may also refer to:

Music
Kizuna (album), a 2022 album by JO1
"Kizuna" (Aya Matsuura song)
"Kizuna" (Aya Ueto song)
"Kizuna" (Orange Range song)
 "Kizuna", a song from the anime Mermaid Melody Pichi Pichi Pitch
 "Kizuna", a song by Tiana Xiao
 "Kizuna", a song from Seishun Amigo by Kazuya Kamenashi
 "Kizuna", a song by  Ayane
 "Kizuna", a piece of music from the anime Fairy Tail
 "Kizuna", a song by the Japanese power metal group Galneryus.
"Kizuna", a song by Aimer
 Sakura Gakuin 2013 Nendo: Kizuna, a 2014 album by Sakura Gakuin
"Kizuna Music", a song from BanG Dream! Ss2 Opening

Film
Kizuna, an action RPG (role-playing game) for Wii developed by Jaleco
Kizuna, a 1998 Japanese film directed by Kichitaro Negishi
Gekijōban Naruto Shippūden: Kizuna, the fifth Naruto movie (second in the Shippūden series)
Digimon Adventure: Last Evolution Kizuna, 2020 film.

Other
Kizuna bridge, a bridge in Cambodia
Kizuna Encounter, a fighting game for the Neo Geo
Kizuna: Bonds of Love, a yaoi (women's male/male romance) manga
Kizuna, a Japanese political party formed by nine former Lower House members of the Democratic Party of Japan
An alternative name for the WINDS spacecraft
The word was chosen to be 2011's Kanji of the year
Kizuna (horse), a Thoroughbred racehorse
KIZUNA COIN, The Japan's cryptocurrency with Directed acyclic graph (DAG) technology since 2018.
Kizuna AI (Japanese: キズナアイ), The Japanese virtual YouTuber and self-proclaimed artificial intelligence.
Kizuna Rank, also known as Trust Rank, a mechanic in the game Hatsune Miku: Colorful Stage!